Jesmond is a Tyne and Wear Metro station, serving the suburb of Jesmond, Newcastle upon Tyne in Tyne and Wear, England. It joined the network on 11 August 1980, following the opening of the first phase of the network, between Haymarket and Tynemouth via Four Lane Ends.

History
The Tyne and Wear Metro station was designed by Faulkner-Brown Hendy Watkinson Stonor and L. J. Couves & Partners. It was chosen by Simon Jenkins as one of the top 100 stations in Britain, being described as a "miniature homage to the modernist architect Mies van der Rohe". In the treatment of the roof detailing and glass external walls, there are some similarities to Mies' New National Gallery in Berlin.

The former North Eastern Railway station was built in the 1860s, to a design by John Dobson. The station opened under the Blyth and Tyne Railway, which ran from Blyth to Newcastle New Bridge Street. The line was later linked to Newcastle Central, and became part of the North Tyneside Loop.

The station closed in January 1978, to allow for the construction of the Tyne and Wear Metro network, using a new alignment in a tunnel, bypassing the original station. The new station was built to the north west of the former, re-opening in August 1980.

The main station building is still present, and is now The Carriage public house. The building is grade II listed and is the last remaining station of the former Blyth and Tyne Railway. A mockup of a signal box was built in the early 1990s, on the site of the former station master's house (demolished in the late 1970s), forming part of a restaurant, along with an old railway carriage.

A line still runs through the former station linking, the Tyne and Wear Metro line to the north of Jesmond, with the line to the west of Manors.

Facilities 
Step-free access is available at all stations across the Tyne and Wear Metro network, with two lifts providing step-free access to platforms at Jesmond. The station is equipped with ticket machines, seating, next train information displays, timetable posters, and an emergency help point on both platforms. Ticket machines are able to accept payment with credit and debit card (including contactless payment), notes and coins. The station is fitted with automatic ticket barriers, which were installed at 13 stations across the network during the early 2010s, as well as smartcard validators, which feature at all stations. The station houses a newsagent's shop and coffee kiosk.

There is no dedicated car parking available at this station. There is the provision for cycle parking, with five cycle pods available for use.

Services 
, the station is served by up to ten trains per hour on weekdays and Saturday, and up to eight trains per hour during the evening and on Sunday.

Rolling stock used: Class 599 Metrocar

Art
The Garden Front art installation, was commissioned for the station in 1978, and was designed by sculptor Raf Fulcher. It is located in the enclosed space to the rear of the building.

The station also houses the Abstract Murals installation, created by Simon Butler. This artwork was commissioned in 1983, and consists of vitreous enamel panels with brightly coloured geometric shapes.

References

External links
 
 Timetable and station information for Jesmond

Newcastle upon Tyne
1980 establishments in England
Railway stations in Great Britain opened in 1980
Tyne and Wear Metro Green line stations
Tyne and Wear Metro Yellow line stations
Transport in Newcastle upon Tyne
Transport in Tyne and Wear
Railway stations located underground in the United Kingdom